Sepečides Romani also known as Sevlengere Roma (meaning "basket(weaving) Roma" is the Romani dialect of the traditionally basketweaving Roma, originally from Thessaloniki (regional unit), in Greece. Their ancestors live there as Nomads during the Ottoman Empire until the population exchange between Greece and Turkey, The dialect has many Greek and Turkish loanwords. It belongs to the Southern Balkan group of Romani language dialects although the RomArchive claims the language is practically extinct. The loanword verb markers in Romani "are often Greek derived markers, maintained even when contact with Greek has ceased." Linguist Petra Cech published a monograph codifying this dialect in 1996. Many of the Sepečides from Greece live in Izmir, where their descendants speak only Turkish. The Sepečides dialect is considered to be non-Vlach.

Origin
The Sepetçileri (meaning basket-makers, plural of Sepečides) originate from Sulukule, especially to Rumelia.
 
The Izmirli Sepečides Roma people, also known as Sevlengere Roma, are of Greek/Turkish origin. Genetic research clearly shows that the Early Romani originated in the Indian subcontinent. Up until about 1920 the traditional profession of these Roma people was the making and selling of baskets. According to the Rombase of the University of Graz, "they all spoke Greek, some of them also Turkish, fluently." The Sevlengere Roma people lived in communities in Greece (primarily in the Chalkidike peninsula) and later lived in Turkey. They share a linguistic variation of Balkan Romani.

During the population exchange between Greece and Turkey, the Christian and Greek Sepeticides remained in Greece, as did the Muslims who adopted the Orthodox religion; those who remained Muslim  went to Turkey. Many of the families that left Saloniki but remained in Greece settled in the Volos area and became Greek-Orthodox. The children of these families speak Romani as their first language, followed by Greek. The others who were more inclined towards Turkish and the Muslim religion and who moved to Turkey and speak only Turkish as their mother tongue. Some of the old settlements where they once lived include Tralangere (Trala, a village near Saloniki) and Kardičakere (also known as Karditsa, in northern Greece).  In 1920, migrants wishing to avoid the Greco-Turkish war presented themselves as either Greeks or Turks and alternated between using two flags to identify themselves.

Greece 
The Sepečides Romani who were Greek or converted to the Greek-orthodox faith and remained in Greece after 1923 moved south to settle in Volos. Their families primarily speak a Greek dialect with some Turkish words. These Romani tend to call themselves Sevlengere Roma (meaning ("basket(weaving) Roma"). The younger generation's first language is Romani, followed by Greek.
The Sevlengere on the island of Skyros are Greek Roma or are the descendants of the Muslim Roma who stayed and converted to Greek Orthodox.
Some of the Orthodox Sevlengere also settled in Volax. The Sepečides who remained in Greece at Volos took up the additional profession of carpet trade, unlike their Roma relatives in Izmir.

Turkey 
In Menemen, some Sepečides still make baskets. In Anamur Edremit, Düzce and Kozan, Adana the descendants of the Sepečides also weave baskets. Some settled in East Thrace and Evreşe at Gelibolu after 1923 and still weave Baskets. Some descendants of the former Sepetçi in Istanbul became flower sellers or musicians.
A group of Sepetçiler settled in the 1950s in Söke where they still weave baskets. Some words and phrases from the old Sepečides dialect survived, but their main language is now Turkish.

See also
 Sepetciler Palace
 Basketry Museum of the Roma

References

Romani in Turkey
 
Romani in Greece
Dialects of Romani